Paralepa is a small borough in Ridala Parish, Lääne County, western Estonia. As of 2011 Census, the settlement's population was 306.

References

Boroughs and small boroughs in Estonia